Madonna is an ally recognized as a gay icon. She was introduced while still a teenager by her dance instructor Christopher Flynn, an openly gay man who became her mentor. Since then, Madonna has always acknowledged the importance of the community for her life and career, declaring that "I wouldn't have a career if it weren't for the gay community". 

Madonna has consistently been an advocate for the LGBT community throughout her career, being recognized by GLAAD Media Awards in 1991 (Raising Gay Awareness) and 2019 (Advocate for Change). Madonna's works often use gay culture as a symbolic repertoire. In an era not dominated by the massification of Internet, she served as a mainstream vehicle, being tagged as "the first major mainstream artist to give gay images and themes explicit mass treatment and exposure".

Madonna has been recognized as a "pioneering ally" by academic and press accounts from outlets such as The New York Times and Associated Press (AP), after a special emphasis in the AIDS crisis when the community was substantially stigmatized and she was one of the very first artists to advocate for the cause, according to publications like The Hollywood Reporter. Using her popularity, she became "the first worldwide celebrity" of that era to do an interview with a national gay magazine, The Advocate, according to themselves. Critic Stephen Holden labeled her interview with them as an "unprecedented frankness for a major star". Sarah Kate Ellis, president of GLAAD stated in 2019: "Madonna always has and always will be the LGBTQ community's greatest ally". Madonna has been considered by "many" over the years as the "greatest gay icon", a statement seconded or confirmed by outlets such as The Advocate or Parade among others. 

Madonna's influence impacted generations of LGBT people, as documented diverse authors. People from the community such as Matt Cain and Anderson Cooper have talked about her influence in their own lives, addressing their LGBT background, while for Ellen DeGeneres, Madonna was instrumental for her 1997 decision to come out. Rosie O'Donnell made similar remarks. Over the years, Madonna has been credited variously, for her role in bringing gay culture into the mainstream, including making lesbianism acceptable as authors such as Cain or Mark Bego claimed. However, she was also accused of "appropriation" both inside and outside the community, and other criticisms came from diverse sectors including religious, where she was depicted with moral horror. In many aspects, her representation and relationship was commented in Australasian gay & lesbian law journal, in 1993, as they recalled "nowhere has this issue been more hotly debated than in Madonna's 'relationship' with gay and lesbian subcultures".

Friendship and introduction
Madonna was introduced to the gay community while still a teenager. It was her ballet teacher, Christopher Flynn, a gay man, who first told Madonna that she had something to offer the world. He also introduced her to the local gay community of Detroit, Michigan, often taking her to local gay bars and discotheques. Observing Flynn she was "conscious of understanding that there was such a thing as gay... It wasn't called that then. I just came to understand that he was attracted to men". Biographer Carol Gnojewski, wrote "some Madonna devotees tout Christopher Flynn as 'arguably the first Madonna-positive person'". 

After moving to New York City in the 1970s to pursue a career in modern dance, Madonna would be surrounded by gay men, including art-world figures such as the plastic artist Keith Haring. Her immersion into the New York gay community became so complete that she began to wish that she were gay: "I didn't feel like straight men understood me. They just wanted to have sex with me. Gay men understood me, and I felt comfortable around them".

Christopher Glazek, explains: "Madonna has been intimately connected to a wide community of gay men for decades, as an artistic collaborator, as a political ally, as an employer, as a friend, and as a sister". Some examples include her first book Sex when collaborated with a gay photographer, and included gay models. She repeated in interviews that her best friends are gay. After David Collins's death, Madonna penned a letter describing his influence on her life. Madonna has an openly gay brother, Christopher Ciccone, while the singer outed in an interview with The Advocate without asking his permission first. 

By the end of the 1980s and early 1990s, media "romantically linked" her name with various women, including Sandra Bernhard, Ingrid Casares, and model Jenny Shimizu, nor confirmed or denied by Madonna. In 1991, Madonna told to The Advocate that she believed "everybody has a bisexual nature".

Advocacy and life as an LGBT icon

Madonna has a long-lasting history advocating for the community, and "actively participating in gay culture" according to LGBT-targeted magazine Attitude. In this aspect, French academic Georges-Claude Guilbert, writes in Gay Icons (2018) that "Madonna has done little else in her career, camping like a gay man, quoting like a gay man". Boy George described Madonna as "a gay man trapped in a woman's body".

20th century (selected)

According to The Hollywood Reporter, Madonna began as one of the first "notable" names in the entertainment industry to advocate in response to the HIV/AIDS epidemic in the 1980s. The period affected the community substantially. Eric Diaz of Nerdist considered her as "the biggest" and "relevant" among young people talking about these problems when government was ignored the "thousands of mostly gay men dying of AIDS".

Madonna made numerous statements in favor of the community. Most notable, in a two-part interview with The Advocate in 1991, Madonna criticized homophobia in the music industry. The New York Times critic, Stephen Holden deemed that interview, as an "unprecedented frankness for a major star". According to The Advocate themselves, it was the first time a worldwide celebrity did an interview with a national gay magazine. Madonna addressed homophobia again in an interview with Good Morning America, saying: "I deal with a lot of  issues… and what I think to be a big problem in the United States and that is homophobia". 

In his 2008 autobiography Hit Man, record producer David Foster relates a meeting with Madonna where he expresses distaste at the sight of two men kissing; Madonna scowled and responded, "Two men kissing should be looked at as normal! You represent everything I'm trying to change."

21st century
In August 2009, during a show in Bucharest, Romania, during her Sticky and Sweet Tour, Madonna criticized discrimination against the Roma, also speaking against the discrimination of gays. 

In June 2010, Madonna released a statement criticizing the decision to jail two men in Malawi because they celebrated their union with a ceremony. Madonna's statement included the following excerpt: "As a matter of principle, I believe in equal rights for all people, no matter what their gender, race, color, religion, or sexual orientation. This week, Malawi took a giant step backward. The world is filled with pain and suffering; therefore, we must support our basic human right to love and be loved. I call upon the progressive men and women of Malawi—and around the world—to challenge this decision in the name of human dignity and equal rights for all."

In November 2010, Madonna made a special appearance on The Ellen DeGeneres Show to speak against the bullying of children and teenagers in general, including the bullying of gay teens and related recent suicides. In her conversation with DeGeneres, Madonna reiterated how she became close to the gay community when she was a teenager, stating that she felt different in high school and found acceptance and sympathy among gay friends, particularly her dance instructor. She also said "In fact, I wouldn't have a career if it weren't for the gay community".

In June 2011, Madonna urged her fans to support same-sex marriage in New York, posting the following message on her website: "New Yorkers your voices must be heard. Tell your state Congressmen to support same sex marriage bill. All you need is love". The Marriage Equality Act passed one week later, legalizing same-sex marriage in New York. The following year, 2013, Madonna asked her audience to "Vote No" on the Minnesota marriage amendment for same-sex couples. 

In March 2013, Madonna presented the Vito Russo Award to openly gay journalist Anderson Cooper at the 24th GLAAD Media Awards in New York City. Dressed as a Boy Scout, in protest of the Boy Scouts of America's ban on homosexual Scouts and Scout leaders, she gave a speech in which she stated that "things like bigotry, homophobia, hate crimes, bullying and any form of discrimination always seem to be a manifestation of fear of the unknown" and wagered that "if we just took the time to get to know one another, did our own investigation, looked beneath the surface of things, that we would find that we are not so different after all." She also said "you cannot use the name of God or religion to justify acts of violence to hurt, to hate, to discriminate." and called to start a revolution, asking the crowd "Are you with me? It's 2013, people. We live in America — land of the free and home of the brave? That's a question, not a statement." That year she joined a Human Rights Campaign's "Love Conquers Hate" to support Russian LGBT community. In 2020, she posted on her Instagram story encouraging her fans to sign a petition on anti-LGBTQ legislation. In a conversation with Reddit users, she answered several questions, including "If you were a gay man, would you be a top or a bottom?" and she said: "I am a gay man".

Madonna has given multiple surprise performances at the Stonewall Inn in Greenwich Village, Manhattan, the birthplace of the modern gay rights movement, including 2018, 2019 and 2022. In her 2018 speech, she said: "I stand here proudly at the place where Pride began. Let us never forget the Stonewall riots". At NYC Pride 2022, Madonna stated metaphorically that New York City was "the best place in the world because of the queer people here. Let me tell you something, if you can make it here, then you must be queer".

Russian incidents

During her Russian stop of The MDNA Tour, Madonna loudly criticized the Russian gay propaganda law in front of a more than 10,000-audience. Her speaking out in favor of gay right and gay pride was a provocation aimed at getting a reaction from state officials. She indeed, drawn criticisms of the Russian government and causing gay-right opponents to sue her as the claimants argued that Madonna's performance would adversely affect Russia's birthrate and therefore its ability to maintain a proper army. One of the claimants, Marina Yakovlyeva told the court: "In the coming years, this type of violation could become the norm. But we have created a precedent —any artist coming to our city will know now what laws exist".

To Western viewers it reaffirmed, if it did not actually initiate, the connection between liberal gay rights issues and Pussy Riot. Miriam Elder, correspondent of The Guardian in Moscow said that Russia "attempted to silence the world's biggest pop star", documenting that some Russian politicians attacked Madonna, with a senior official calling her a "moralising slut". Madonna's Facebook page prior her performance, and that was used in her against, stated:

Referential works

Gay culture is represented in various of her works, with many of her songs and other projects grounded in queer sensibility, including the documentary Truth or Dare, or music videos for her songs "Justify My Love", "Erotica", and "Vogue". The music video for "God Control" was reminiscent of the 2016 Orlando nightclub shooting.

Erin Harde is cited in Catching a Wave (2016) saying that Madonna has supported the gay community by using "camp" values to pay respect to the community. In this aspect, Muri Assunção from Billboard explained that Madonna has been fighting for acceptance and pushing the gay agenda with her art since the release of her first single "Everybody" in 1982. Many Madonna's videos and concerts feature same-sex couples, or herself as part of them. Michael Musto also explained that she turned many of her concerts into a "gigantic gay bar".

Mainstream vehicle

Madonna's figure made possible in her generation provided many with their first impression or representation of the collective, in an era not dominated by Internet. In Good As You: From Prejudice to Pride – 30 Years of Gay Britain (2017), editor Paul Flynn documented that Madonna's Blond Ambition tour was the first time British gay and girls "got to claim ownership of the thrilling communion and euphoria of a stadium show". The tour was followed by her 1991 documentary Truth or Dare in which "several generations of gay men reported was the first time they had ever seen their own desires represent [...] onscreen". Seeing the dance troupe in her 1990 tour, wrote Jeremy Atherton Lin in Gay Bar (2021), "amounted to my first impression of gays". Writing for The Georgia Straight in 2016, Craig Takeuchi explains that many recognized this Madonna's era, as a number were "living in an era prior to the internet and had never seen gay men or gay kissing on screen before". According to LGBT-targeted publication Washington Blade, it became "a gay cultural touchstone".

Louis Virtel of Billboard, said that Madonna accomplished something astounding with "Vogue": She ushered an audacious, unapologetically queer art form into mainstream America, and that means gays everywhere got to witness (and recognize) a rare kind of performative ebullience. For Hopper, she revived an "entire movement" when she performed this song at the 1990 MTV Video Music Awards. Music critic Kelefa Sanneh, said that she "helped define gay nightlife in New York".

Appearances on listicles
Madonna's music was linked to and made appearances in listicles related to the community. In 2017, Louis Virtel from Billboard commented that Pride Month "is not the same without Madonna and her music". In 2005, The Advocates Steve Gdula commented that "back in the 1980s and even the early 1990s, the release of a new Madonna video or single was akin to a national holiday, at least among her gay fans".

Many have considered "Vogue" a gay anthem, and for scholar Georges-Claude Guilbert is "her gayest song" in many ways. The staff of Billboard included the song among the "60 Top LGBTQ Anthems of All Time" that defined queer culture. A years prior, Rolling Stone editors including Suzy Exposito and Rob Sheffield placed the song among their "25 Essential LGBTQ Pride Songs". Around 2012, LGBTQ magazine Out included various Madonna's albums in their list of "The 100 Greatest, Gayest Albums" of all-time, in which it was addressed record's impact for the community. They explained that "Papa Don't Preach" had a "profound meaning for gay men of the Reagan era". Queerty editors, included The Immaculate Collection in their 2022 ranking of albums essential in shaping LGBTQ culture, further describing the compilation as "a must for any gold star gay’s record collection".

Commentaries

Madonna relationship with gay community has attracted commentaries by media and scholars, defined by Samuel R. Murrian from Parade in 2019, as an "unique, historic connection to the LGBTQ community". Her figure resonated across different decades in the community, with a The Advocate editor commenting in the 1990s, "the gay world... gets Madonna in a big way". Commenting about her then-massive appeal, academic Pamela Robertson from University of Notre Dame, wrote in Guilty pleasures (1996), that critics argue that many gay men and lesbians identify with "Madonna's power and independence". Sonya Andermahr from University of Northampton asserted that Madonna's popularity among lesbians is due to her self-determination and autonomy. 

Michael Musto also said: "Her pride, flamboyance, and glamour reach out to gay guys as much as her refusal to be victimized strikes a chord in lesbians". Musto also said that Madonna offers a more quitable model, different from Judy Garland, identified as a gay icon/tragic figure. Judith Peraino, music professor at Cornell University described that Madonna's early hypersexuality had particular resonance with gay men. It was also commented that "the gay attraction to Madonna includes her ubiquitous transformations of image, liberated sexuality and elaborate and often campy stage antics". 

On the other hand, however, over her career various from community have rejected and tried to cancel Madonna, according to various observers. In the 1990s, sexologist Carol Queen wrote about the rejection of Madonna by various gay and lesbian communities during the release of her first book Sex. In 2023, editor Matthew Rettenmund explored a decline amid newer generations, saying she is "frequently rejected" and even at times some with "trying to erase or demonize her past efforts". Similarly, Brazilian writer and academic Renato Gonçalves, in a conversation with Terra Networks in 2020, explored how many from community tried to cancel her with her erratic posts during the COVID-19 lockdowns. With Madonna becoming reflexive, she was criticized by using a hashtag "#DidItFirst" when Lil Nas X kissed a male dancer in 2021. Lil himself, defended Madonna saying "me and Madonna are friends. It's a joke".

Queer theory, and studies
Madonna attained significant academic attention, including in queer studies, being identified as a symbol of queer studies for years. A group of her then scholars worked in queer theory. In the mid-1990s, scholar Michael R. Real in Exploring media culture: A guide (1996) summed up that studies of Madonna by Patton (1993), Henderson (1993), and Schwichtenberg (1993) read her contribution in the community, and how "they find densely coded references with rich meaning for gays and lesbians in Madonna texts".

Criticisms and ambiguity

Madonna has faced a variety of criticisms, inside, or outside the community. She was "accused" for using the gay archive for her own gain and for heterosexualising it. In this aspect, some feminists criticized her pluralistic queernes because it questions the concept of "woman" and homosexual identities and ignores differences. Christopher Glazek said that she has been acussed for "getting rich on the appropriation and mining of gay subcultures". The divided perceptions were remarked by a 1993 article in Australasian gay & lesbian law journal, describing it as "nowhere has this issue been more hotly debated than in Madonna's 'relationship' with gay and lesbian subcultures". 

Largely influenced by bell hooks' criticisms on Madonna in the 1990s, she is "typically credited as the first to use black gay culture, in a clear and forward way" by various critics. A scholar explained Madonna's critics have seen her adoption of homosexual and ethnic subcultural practices more as an appropriation of the style than convincing politics. "Vogue" alone attracted criticisms of appropriation, where in its video served up both real voguing and stylized non-voguing. Some subcultural groups, including black community, criticized her for kitschified their culture when released "Vogue". Therefore, she was viewed as a "straight white woman", and was criticized for the song lyrics, and some said she appropriated the movement for the white population, "even though black dancers featured in the video", wrote Thomas Adamson for Associated Press in 2018.

With the rise of the term queerbaiting since 2010s, Madonna was one of several public figures accused for using it. In 2004, Dick Hall, assistant headmaster at The Lovett School discussed with MedicineNet the Britney Spears-Madonna influence in the raise of the term Celesbian. Madonna was also criticized by public figures that includes Janeane Garofalo when defended Eminem's "homophobic statements" in the early 2000s.

Different individuals have expressed conflicting views on Madonna for her activism or representation of the community. Michael Musto notoriously "spoofed" her, as a mainstream public figure talking about gay awareness was not a favorable thing in his view. Musto said that the term "gay ally" gets tossed around too much, as "if we're supposed to turn somersaults of joy just because someone famous thinks we're actually acceptable human beings who deserve equal rights". However, Musto disregarded some of his criticisms on Madonna, as said in a 2015 retrospective, that "she's more like an honorary gay man. She's one of us". In fact, he remembered that in a 1994 OutWeek cover story, he declared that Madonna "was more influential than any politician out there when it came to equality because her yay-gay gestures were truly changing our landscape in significant ways". Guy Babineau from LGBT-focused publication Xtra Magazine, in 2008, had also ambiguous views on Madonna, who lumped her with contemporary industry colleagues such as Michael Jackson and Prince to say all benefited from their popularity in gay clubs, and he further argues "and all riffed on queer culture to some extent —each affecting an androgynous, outrageous and supercharged sexual persona", but at the same time, he felt "only Madonna credited the gay community. In fact, she glorified it". 

Madonna, caused reactions after a TikTok video posted on October 22, in 2022 with the on-screen caption, "If I miss, I'm Gay"; she then throws the panties toward a nearby wastebasket, and "intentionally" failed. Samantha Chery from Washington Post, noted her video was posted two days early of the National Coming Out Day.

Views on criticism
The amount of criticisms Madonna has commanded, have been scrutinized as well, including by members from the community. In 2015, Christopher Glazek suggested that censuring Madonna for "ransacking gay subcultures could be viewed as just another variation on the time-honored practice of devaluing the accomplishments of female recording artists". By 2017, Tom Breihan from Stereogum describes: "Madonna also loved LGBTQ culture, to the point where she's often been accused of exploiting it". In 2020, Brazilian writer and academic  Renato Gonçalves, explained that since her early career, Madonna opted for diversity, hiring always homosexual dancers, Latinos, Blacks and playing with identities that were largely ignored in mainstream culture. In 2022, with the release of "Break My Soul (The Queens Remix)", The New York Times critic Jon Caramanica commented both Beyoncé and Madonna have received "some criticisms by queer critics who find their work appropriative", but he felt "Madonna is still demonstrating her ongoing, deep engagement with queer culture". In 1995, Los Angeles Times reacted skeptical with The Advocate naming Madonna "Sissy of the Year", as she presented to her audience ambiguous and mystical about many things, including sexuality. But they agreed: "Two things she is very firm about is her support for the lesbian and gay community and doing something about HIV/AIDS".

In the early 1990s, professor Lisa Henderson at Pennsylvania State University cites Down Shewey who interviewed Madonna for The Advocate as saying: "Hollywood doesn't really get Madonna. She doesn't fit any past models of Hollywood stardom". T. Cole Rachel, writing for Pitchfork in 2015, explored Madonna within gay community. The editor also argues "gay fandom is a complicated phenomenon". In 2018, Darren Scott from The Independent wrote and felt that Madonna doesn't "play up" to her gay fan base.

Impact and legacy
Her impact and likeness in the LGBT community have been remarked by numerous LGBT publications and mainstream media alike since the 1980s.

Nicknames and epithets 
Various LGBT publications and international press gave Madonna diverse related nicknames and epithets in her decades-long career. In Queer (2002), editor Simon Gage explained that an UK gay magazine always referred to her as "Our Glorious Leader". In 2022, a contributor from LGBT magazine Shangay Express, discussed her as "Queen Mother Madonna". In 2016, an editor from LGBT publication, Washington Blade referred to her as "Our Lady".

In 2019, Samuel R. Murrian of Parade confirmed that she "is considered by many to be the greatest LGBTQ icon". Scholars Carmine Sarracino and Kevin Scott in The Porning of America (2008), attributed that calling her "the biggest gay icon of all time", was a result of her career-long popularity with gay audiences. Gage called her "the biggest gay icon of the 20th century" in Queer (2002). "The biggest musical LGBTQ icon of all time", at least to an entire generation wrote Eric Diaz for Nerdist in 2018. In 2006 and 2012, editors from The Advocate named Madonna "the greatest gay icon". In 2022, an editor from BBC Mundo considered her as the "quintessential gay icon". 

Madonna is also referred to as a queer icon and icon of queerness. Theologian Robert Goss expressed: "For me, Madonna has been not only a queer icon but also a Christ icon who has dissolved the boundaries between queer culture and queer faith communities". Musicologist Sheila Whiteley wrote in her book Sexing the Groove: Popular Music and Gender (2013) that "Madonna came closer to any other contemporary celebrity in being an above-ground queer icon".

Recognition of her activism

AIDS crisis affecting the community

She donated time and money to charitable organizations in favor of the community and the AIDS crisis. She spent perhaps more time in vocal advocacy. There were predecessors and contemporary artists helping for the crisis, although a number of reviewers compared her global reach and with Christopher Rosa from Glamour saying "she faced several of these battles alone". The era, is considered by various, as a period that affected considerably the community, and it was called a "gay disease" with a country reacting by several measurements as antigay. Rosa called it as "perhaps Madonna's greatest social contribution".

Guy Babineau from LGBT-focused publication Xtra Magazine mentioned other predecessors like Cher and Bette Midler but explaining that "neither spoke to the awakening albeit confused sexual freedom of young women and gay men in the era of the AIDS the way Madonna did". Babineau also mentioned others "gay-er" pop stars during that era, and in a similar connotation, Eric Diaz said that various gay pop stars hid "their sexual orientation from the wrath of a homophobic public". In comparison, Christopher Glazek said Madonna "became gay" by association. Along with her sexual image, her advocacy contributed to spread rumors that she was a HIV-positive. In 1991, Richard Rouilard from The Advocate recalls, "I think this particular rumor is entirely AIDS-phobic and homophobic [...] It's a backlash at Madonna for being so actively involved in AIDS and championing gay people, both in her movies and in her interviews".

"When other artists tried to distance themselves from the very audience that helped their stars to rise, Madonna only turned the light back on her gay fans and made it burn all the brighter", said Steve Gdula from The Advocate in 2005. Diaz describes her advocacy as saying she "grabbed a bullhorn and shouted from the rooftops that she was not only a strong ally of the gay community, but that she also owed her gay mentors and friends for the person she had become". Darren Scott from The Independent cited that straight were horrified at the depiction, but Madonna would publicly lay into homophobic people in interviews and in the early 1990s, it wasn't "cool to do so". In 1991, writing for LGBT newspaper San Francisco Bay Times, Don Baird said: "Never has a pop star forced so many of the most basic and necessary elements of gayness right into the face of this increasingly uptight nation with power and finesse. Her message is clear -Get Over It- and she's the most popular woman in the world who's talking up our good everything".

Post-AIDS crisis

As she continued her advocacy, many reviewers praised her long-standing contributions. By 2015, Glazek held that "it's hard to think of any celebrity who has done more than Madonna to promote public awareness of gay culture". In Listening to the Sirens (2006), music professor Judith A. Peraino proposes that "no one has worked harder to be a gay icon than Madonna, and she has done so by using every possible taboo sexual in her videos, performances, and interviews". Sarah Kate Ellis, president and CEO of GLAAD, stated in 2019 that Madonna "always has and always will be the LGBTQ community's greatest ally". Years prior, in 2015, Andy Towle discussed her as "the Most Pro-Gay Pop Ally of All Time". 
 
The Associated Press in a 2019 published article for USA Today called her a "pioneer for gay rights". The staff of The New York Times also called her "a pioneering ally" in 2018, recognizing both her pre and post-AIDS crisis advocacy describing:

Her advocacy has also been recognized in ceremonies awards. GLAAD Media Awards awarded Madonna in 1991, with the GLAAD for Raising Gay Awareness. In 2019, the organization gave her the GLAAD Advocate for Change, for which she became the second person and first woman to receive the award. In 2017, British LGBT Awards placed her among their Top 10 LGBT Music Artists.

Attributed effects on culture

While there were others helping as well, her single solo influence and contributions for the community attracted solid international views perceiving cultural effects in favor to the community, often described as a perpetued entrance to the "mainstream". 

Editors of Sontag and the Camp Aesthetic (2017), commented "in many ways, Madonna contributed to making gay mainstream" and "part of this contribution was her colonization of queer male, non-white subculture to the benefit of modern queer". For Constantine Chatzipapatheodoridis, she has been contributed in the socio-artistic evolution of queer culture worldwide. Craig Takeuchi from The Georgia Straight attributes to Madonna's period of her Truth or Dare film along with the Blond Ambition Tour for "brought gay culture to the mainstream". British writer Matt Cain attributed her for bringing gay culture into the mainstream as well. Writing for 20 minutos in 2019, José Casesmeiro gave Madonna a "fundamental" role to normalize the collective. Alex Hopper of American Songwriter as do others, explained that Madonna contributed to bringing ballroom culture and voguing into mainstream pop culture. 

C. E. Crimmins in How the homosexuals saved civilization (2004), called Madonna a "pioneer" explaining that in the 1980s and 1990s, she was "the first homosexual icon to interact with her audience sexually (well, unless you count Judy Garland's marriages to gay men)". In this area, Gina Vivinetto from The Advocate held in 2015, that since the 1980s "Madonna has been giving visibility to LGBT eroticism". Darren Scott goes further saying Madonna changed the way people perceived gay sex.

On lesbianism

Mark Bego commented that her exploration of traditional gender roles helped make lesbianism acceptable to mainstream society. In a 1989 article for Gay Community News, Sydney Pokorny refers the duo Madonna and Sandra Bernhard that inspired such devotion from lesbians. 

Lucy O'Brien cited an editor from Lesbian-targeted magazine Diva whom described "Madonna became meaningful in the early nineties with that lesbian chic thing [...] There was a hunger to see ourselves reflected in popular culture, and she made us visible". Writer Thomas Dyja in New York, New York, New York (2022), also lumped the public dilliance between Madonna and Bernhard along with Martina Navratilova and k.d. lang for ushering the lesbian chic. Torie Osborn, executive director of National LGBTQ Task Force asserted: "[She's] the first major woman pop star who's out and proud and fine about it. It signals a whole new era of possibility for celebrities". Osborn also credited k.d. lang in bringing a new peak for Lipstick lesbian. An author described Madonna, as the archetypal femme lesbian, regarded both the champion of sexual feminism and the pirate of traditional lesbian feminist lifestyles. 

Madonna sparked again conversations after kissing Christina Aguilera and Britney Spears at the 2003 MTV Video Music Awards. Her kiss with Spears became then the most searched picture on internet, according to Semana. Their kiss have been replicated numerous times, including by Israeli activists in 2019, to celebrate Madonna's arrival at the Eurovision Song Contest and to show that "love break down barriers". In popular culture, celebrities such as Kylie Jenner have recreated the scene as well.

Influence on individuals

Madonna's influence in the community has been much quoted, noted in a decades-long period. An author described Madonna "changed the lives of millions of her young, LGBTQ fans". Ben Kelly of The Independent felt that "for many, she was the accepting mother they never had". In 2019, Sarah Kate Ellis said: "Her music and art have been life-saving outlets for LGBTQ people over the years and her affirming words and actions have changed countless hearts and minds". While Michael Musto was ambiguous towards Madonna's advocacy and influence at some point, he recognizes her importance for gay men as a mainstream figure who interceded on their behalf. The Hollywood Reporter also remarked "her music and advocacy has positively affected the lives of LGBTQ people". In this regard, Madonna told: "It's a total reciprocation because, like I said in my speech (2019 GLAAD Media Awards), they made me feel not afraid to be different. And then I made them feel not afraid to be different".

Various public figures from the community such as British journalist Matt Cain and musician Arca, have discussed Madonna's impact in their lives addressing their LGBT background. The lattermost expressed: "I don't know if I can't overstate how major Madonna's music and persona were in my household". Christopher Bergland, commented that a 1983 performance she made at a small gay club on Lansdowne St. in Boston, changed his life. In February 2023, when Kim Petras became the first openly transgender woman to win a Grammy Award, she thanked Madonna in her acceptance speech for fighting for LGBTQ rights, saying "I don't think I could be here without Madonna". Anderson Cooper noted the importance of Madonna to him and said during the 2019 GLAAD Media Awards:

Commemorating her 60-years old birthday in 2018, The Advocate dedicated an article of love letters to Madonna that included commentaries from their staff, with many talking about Madonna's influence on them. Editors of Queer Media Images: LGBT Perspectives (2013) explained that thanks in part to the good press by Madonna, Katy Perry's song "I Kissed a Girl" gained popularity quickly. 

Madonna topped KBGO's 2011 rank of the "stars that helped their LGBTQ+ Fans Come Out". Agence France-Presse referred to her Truth or Dare film inspired many to coming out. Wesley Morris of The New York Times, said that maybe he knew was gay because of Madonna: Truth or Dare. Ellen DeGeneres said that Madonna was instrumental in her 1997 decision to come out. Rosie O'Donnell similarly credited Madonna to help her become more comfortable in her own skin about her LGBT life.

Depictions

Madonna has been depicted in diverse LGBT-media content. Bimini Bon Boulash wrote "would any queer inspiration be complete without the Queen of Pop herself?". In 2016, to pay tribute to her contributions to the LGBT community, contestants of the eighth season of reality competition show RuPaul's Drag Race were asked to render some of prominent Madonna looks on the runway. In effort to address the criticism the runway received for its repetitiveness, it was brought back for season nine. In season 12, the reality show paid tribute to Madonna again as the contestants performed in Madonna: The Unauthorized Rusical, a musical that chronicled her major accomplishments and contributions to the LGBT community. Madonna's influence shaped Poses season two, as Billboard reported. 

Glee dedicated to Madonna an episode named "The Power of Madonna" accompanied with their first-ever EP released, Glee: The Music, The Power of Madonna. In Brian Tarquin's book The Insider's Guide to Music Licensing (2014), it was mentioned the importance of Madonna for their producers and the challenges they faced and weeks of negotiation with Madonna's team. Both episode and soundtrack were well received, with an insider commenting, "If you do justice arguably to the biggest female act in the world, people will respond". Her episode was also the first time the music on Glee was turned over in its entirety to one performer as well. The documentary Strike a Pose is based in the dance troupe that accompanied Madonna in the documentary Truth or Dare and the Blond Ambition Tour; six of them were homosexual at a time when "homosexuality was much more taboo and associated by many straight people with illness". 
 
LGBT-targeted publications such as The Advocate, Attitude, to DNA have created listicles about "Madonna's gayest moments". Other publications like HuffPost addressed similar lists. In the letter sections of LGBT magazine Out of February 2005, a reader stated that she "positioned herself to be a gay icon before it was cool to be one".

Critic' lists and publications

See also

 LGBT history
 Madonna studies
 Madonna and sexuality

References

Book sources

 
 
 
 
 
 
 
 
 
 
 
 
 
 
 
 
 
 
 
 
 
 
 
 
 
 
 
 
 
 
 
 
 
 
 
 
 }

External links
 Madonna's official site
 Madonna at GLAAD
 Madonna at The Advocate
 Madonna at Out
 Madonna at Gay Times

Further reading
 Vogue Boy: Reeling in Pride: 10 years ago, his video dancing to 'Vogue' at Hampton Beach went viral — The Portsmouth Herald
 Beyond Madonna: A More Colorful Picture of Queer History — Wired
 I Made It Through the Wilderness: On Gay Fandom, and Growing Older with Madonna — Pitchfork

Gay icon
Madonna
LGBT-related music
Gay icon
Articles containing video clips